William Czar Bradley (March 23, 1782March 3, 1867) was an American lawyer and politician. He served as U.S. Representative from Vermont.

Biography
Born in Westminster in the Vermont Republic, Bradley was the son of United States Senator Stephen Row Bradley. Bradley received his early education in the schools of Cheshire, Connecticut, and Charlestown, New Hampshire. As a child prodigy, he entered Yale College for a short time at the age of thirteen, but was expelled for pranks. He studied law, was admitted to the bar and commenced practice in Westminster in 1802. Also in 1802 Bradley married Sarah Richards, the daughter of Mark Richards, who served in Congress and as lieutenant governor.  He served as prosecuting attorney for Windham County, as a member of the Vermont House of Representatives, and as member of the Governor's council.

Bradley was elected as a Democratic-Republican to the Thirteenth Congress, serving from March 4, 1813 to March 3, 1815. Bradley was an agent of the United States under the Treaty of Ghent to fix the boundary line between Maine and Canada from  1815 to 1820. He served again in the United States Congress when was elected as an Adams-Clay Democratic-Republican to the Eighteenth Congress and as an Adams to the Nineteenth Congress, serving from March 4, 1823 to March 3, 1827.

After leaving Congress, Bradley resumed the practice of law. He was an unsuccessful candidate for Governor several times, running as a Democratic candidate in 1830, 1834 and 1838. (Daniel Kellogg, the husband of Bradley's daughter Merab, was the Democratic nominee for governor in 1843, 1844 and 1845.) Bradley then ran as an unsuccessful Free Soil Party candidate in 1848, and an unsuccessful candidate on the Fremont ticket in 1856.

He served as presidential elector on the Republican ticket in 1856, and cast his vote for John C. Fremont, the first presidential candidate of the Republican Party. Bradley served as member of the State constitutional convention in 1857. He retired from the practice of law in 1858.

Death and legacy
Bradley died in Westminster on March 3, 1867, and is interred in the Old Westminster Cemetery in Westminster.

A bust of Bradley was sculpted around 1860 by sculptor Larkin Goldsmith Mead, and is on display in the Vermont Historical Society museum.

Bradley's law office in Westminster was deeded to the State of Vermont in 1998. Bradley used the law office from 1810 until his retirement in 1858; the law office had been undisturbed until it was deeded to the state. In July 2001 The William Czar Bradley Law Office was opened to the public.

Published works
Bradley began writing poetry at an early age, and published his first book, "The Rights of Youth," at the age of twelve.

 "Verses in a Watch," in John Walter Coates & Frederick Tucker (eds.), Vermont Verse: An Anthology 32 (Brattleboro, Vermont: Stephen Daye Press, 1932)
 "A Ballad of Judgment and Mercy," in A.J. Sanborn (ed.), Green Mountain Poets 158-160 (Claremont, New Hampshire: Claremont Manufacturing Co., 1872)

References

Further reading
 The Honorable William Czar Bradley: His Correspondence and Speeches, 1782-1872, published August 3, 2011 by Heritage Books, Inc

External links 

 
 govtrack.us
 The Political Graveyard
 Our Campaigns
 Lawyers and Poetry: William Czar Bradley
 Schlesinger Library, Harvard University: Bradley family. Papers, 1813-1957: A Finding Aid
 Vermont Historical Society

1782 births
1867 deaths
People from Westminster (town), Vermont
American people of English descent
Democratic-Republican Party members of the United States House of Representatives from Vermont
National Republican Party members of the United States House of Representatives from Vermont
Vermont Democrats
Vermont Free Soilers
Vermont National Republicans
Vermont Republicans
State's attorneys in Vermont
Vermont lawyers
Yale College alumni
Burials in Vermont
19th-century American lawyers